This is a list of destinations served currently by Air China. For freighter destinations see Air China Cargo.

List

References

 Air China (CAAC) 1956 route map
 1957 route map.
 Some CAAC routes 1985/86 from Karachi

Lists of airline destinations
Air China
Star Alliance destinations